Cristina Pezzoli (died May 22, 2020) was an Italian theatre director.

References

1963 births
2020 deaths
Italian theatre directors